Montreal Bulldogs was a Canadian football team in Interprovincial Rugby Football Union. The team played in the 1940 and 1941 seasons. During their first season the team did not have a nickname, and was simply called Montreal Football Club, until the next season.

Canadian Football Hall of Famers
John Ferraro

IRFU season-by-season

References
CFLdb - Montreal Bulldogs

Interprovincial Rugby Football Union teams
Defunct Canadian football teams
Ind